Ustye is a rural locality (a selo) in Petinskoye Rural Settlement, Khokholsky District, Voronezh Oblast, Russia. The population was 1,104 as of 2010. There are 20 streets.

Geography 
Ustye is located on the right bank of the Don River, 22 km of from Khokholsky (the district's administrative centre) by road. Malyshevo is the nearest rural locality.

References 

Rural localities in Khokholsky District